The Doomspell Trilogy is a trilogy of fantasy novels by Cliff McNish.

Novels 
The books in this trilogy (in reading order) are:

The Doomspell 
In The Doomspell, Rachel and Eric are sucked into a snow-covered world called Ithrea, by a witch called Dragwena.  They meet a nice old man named Morpeth, who is over 500 years old and, like Rachel and Eric, was removed from Earth by Dragwena.  Rachel is fooled into believing that she is becoming a witch by Dragwena, and her magic, trying to be helpful, tries to make her a witch.  During the transformation, Dragwena lets Rachel inside her mind, giving Rachel access to the spells there.  As Rachel's skills develop, she finds that she is more than a match for Dragwena.  With the help of the Wizard Larpskendya, she kills Dragwena, and Larpskendya removes the spells making it snow.  Morpeth then returns to Earth with Rachel and Eric.

The Scent of Magic 
In The Scent of Magic, Dragwena's spirit arrives on the Witches' home world, Ool, and from it Dragwena's mother, Heebra, learns of the children Rachel and Eric. Rachel can do powerful spells and Eric can destroy spells, so Heebra sets out to destroy them and enslave all the other children on Earth. After the witches arrive, they use the children to tease and frustrate Rachel and Eric, who were previously unaware of the presence of other magical children on their home world.  Calen, Dragwena's younger sister and Heebra's daughter, trains up another human girl, Heiki, to fight Rachel.  Rachel meets a human baby boy named Yemi who is also very powerful. Yemi also awakens the children of earth's magic which leads to Heebra being killed.

The Wizard's Promise 
In The Wizard's Promise, the previously released Gridda Witches have taken over Ool.  They try to find Rachel and Eric, and use them to find the Wizards.  Larpskendya's brother Serpantha unsuccessfully tries to negotiate with the Griddas, and is imprisoned and tortured to tell the Griddas where the Wizards' home world is.  The spectrums, children with large ears, devoted to the protection of the children, try to work out the best strategy to save all the children.  In the end, the Griddas (with the help of Eric) find the Wizards' home world, and are welcomed on to it by the original, peaceful witches.

Characters 
The main characters in this trilogy are:

Rachel 
Rachel is a very magically gifted child who takes it upon herself to protect the world. After being abducted by the witch Dragwena, she learns how to cast magic. Later, after returning to earth, she serves an important role in novels protecting earth from witch  assaults.  She decides in The Wizard's Promise to go to Ool, instead of letting the Griddas invade their planet.

Eric 
Eric is extremely gifted and he is the only living person who can destroy spells.  Once he has destroyed a spell, the caster of that spell has lost it for ever, and can never cast that spell again. Eric can also sense magic from far away. The Griddas find out about this power and uses him to find Orin Fen (the wizards home world). He can also take away the magic from magical beings even if they are not using it.

Morpeth 
Morpeth is a man who was taken from Earth to Ithrea by Dragwena at an early age (as is everyone on Ithrea except for Dragwena). He is described as a small man (under five foot) with a flat square nose. 
While practicing her spells, Rachel transforms into a particle of dust and enters Morpeth's body to change him, making him taller, rejuvenating his features and giving him back the bright blue eyes and sandy hair he had as a youth. At the end of The Doomspell, he is returned to his child-form, as are the rest of the people of Ithrea.
When the inhabitants of Ithrea are given the choice to return to Earth, or stay on the newly reformed Ithrea, only Morpeth chooses to return.  Morpeth chooses to give up his magic, but, finding he needs it for his comfort, later asks Larpskendya to return it.

Dragwena 
Dragwena is a High Witch, the daughter of Heebra. Dragwena tried to instill Magic in the children of the Earth, so that they could be used in the Witches' war against the Wizards.  However, she was banished from Earth by the Wizards, who imprisoned her on Ithrea (a very lenient punishment, as she had a whole world to herself, though she was isolated from her sister Witches).  She found a way to circumvent the Wizards' ban, and snatched the most magical children from the Earth.  When she was defeated, her soul made a journey back to the Witches' home world, where it told Heebra and Calen of Earth, Rachel, and Eric, prompting the Witches to come to Earth to learn more about the magical children. She has four sets of teeth and a snake called a soul snake wrapped around her neck.

Larpskendya 
Larpskendya is a Wizard, one of the two last wizards alive (Larpskendya's brother, Serpantha is the other one).  He helps Rachel and Eric return to Earth in The Doomspell.  He is involved in the war against the Witches, as he is extraordinarily powerful. He was also one of the three of wizards who enslaved the witch Dragwena when she first tried to take over earth.

Heebra 
Heebra is the leader of the High Witches.  She is an immensely powerful witch, who has been personally involved in the war between the Wizards and the Witches.  She is the mother of Dragwena and Calen.  She made the decision to release the Griddas to act as a diversion to the Wizards while the Witches were attacking Earth.

Calen 
Calen is the daughter of Heebra and the sister of Dragwena.  When the witches invade Earth, she tries to train the children to become merciless and ruthless.  She personally trains Heiki to defeat Rachel. In the third book Calen is imprisoned by the Griddas and eventually Serpantha sets her free.

Heiki 
Heiki is a girl trained by Calen to defeat Rachel.  When she was defeated, Calen left her.  At that point Heiki stopped wanting to be a witch and united with Rachel, and first shows her loyalty at the end of "The Scent of Magic" when she stands with Rachel against the witches on Earth.  In The Wizard's Promise, Heiki helps take command of the Earth's defences when Rachel has left for Ool. She was abandoned as a baby and wanted revenge on adults and hated other people too, for reason's left to the reader's imagination, making her the perfect person to fight Rachel as she could easily be convinced she was needed.

Yemi 
Yemi is an immensely powerful young child, with power beyond other magic users (for instance, he manages to hold his own against a combined assault by hundreds of Griddas in the third book).  He has the ability to take aggressively cast spells and modify the spells of others.  He can also "borrow" magic from other people, using it to enhance his own.  He is constantly followed by animals, and by his pet butterflies, which are all Camberwell beauties.

Serpantha 
Serpantha is Larpskendya's brother, and also a Wizard.  When Eric communicates with his spells, he finds that they are tired and weary of the battle with the Witches.  He willingly goes to negotiate with the Griddas, who imprison and torture him.  Eventually he is rescued by Rachel.

Gultrathaca
Gultrathaca is the pack leader of the Griddas, a warlike subspecies of the High Witches. Driven by her lust for violence, she manipulates Eric into finding the location of the Wizard home world Orin Fen so she can make war on the Wizards openly. She also tries to kill Rachel by taking advantage of her trusting nature.

External links
Cliff Mcnish's homepage

Fantasy novel trilogies